Antoinette Gasongo (born 1994 or 1996) is a Burundian judoka.

She competed at the 2016 Summer Olympics in Rio de Janeiro, in the women's 52 kg but lost to Joana Ramos in the first round.

References

External links 
 

1990s births
Living people
Burundian female judoka
Olympic judoka of Burundi
Judoka at the 2016 Summer Olympics
Year of birth uncertain